According to traditional Chinese medicine, the kidney (Chinese: 腎: shèn) refers to either of the two viscera located on the small of the back, one either side of the spine. As distinct from the Western medical definition of kidneys, the TCM concept is more a way of describing a set of interrelated parts than an anatomical organ. In TCM the kidneys are associated with "the gate of Vitality" or "Ming Men". A famous Chinese doctor named Zhang Jie Bin (approximately 1563-1640) wrote "there are two kidneys, (kidney yin and yang), with the Gate of Vitality between them. The kidney is the organ of water and fire, the abode of yin and yang, the sea of essence, and it determines life and death."

TCM overview
The kidney (Shen) is a Zang organ meaning it is a Yin organ.  The other Yin, or Zang, organs are the lungs (Fei), liver (Gan), spleen (Pi), and heart (Xin).  Sometimes the pericardium (Xin Bao) is included.  Yin organs store, secrete, make, and transform essence, blood, spirit, Qi, and fluids.

Kidney main functions
The main functions of the kidney are:
storing essence (jing) and dominating human reproduction and development
dominating water metabolism and the reception of qi from the air (Kong Qi)
producing marrow to fill up the brain
dominating bone
manufacturing blood
manifesting in the hair (on the head)
opening into the ear and dominating the two lower yin (the anus and urethra)
dominating anterior and posterior orifices.
housing the Zhi (will-power)
fluid secretions are urine, semen, and vaginal fluids.

Storing essence and dominating development and reproduction
The kidney's primary function is storing and controlling 'essence', or jing. Jing is the essence of qi and the basis for body matter and functional activities.  There are two types of jing, congenital jing and acquired jing, which are stored in the kidney and known as kidney jing. Unlike qi, jing circulates in long cycles (seven years for females and eight years for males) governing developmental stages.  The function of jing is to promote growth, development and reproduction, provide the basis for kidney qi, produce marrow, and provide the basis for jing, qi and shen (mind).

Congenital jing comes from the parents and determines basic constitution; it cannot be altered, but it can be positively influenced by acquired jing.  Acquired jing is produced from food by the spleen and stomach, stored in the kidney and circulated in the body.  Congenital and acquired jing have a promoting/ controlling relationship with each other and their interaction produces kidney jing; all three play a part in determining growth and development, sexual maturation, reproduction, and aging.

Every new jing cycle prompts a new cycle of development.  For example, congenital jing exists from conception, carrying on from the jing of the parents.  Once a child is born, acquired jing is responsible for replenishing congenital jing and starting the first independent jing cycle which, for the next seven years in girls and eight years in boys, will control growth and development.  When the child loses its baby teeth, its body begins the pre-adolescence cycle.  The next jing cycle is adolescence, when kidney jing matures and causes the ren meridian to open and flow.  At this time, part of the kidney jing transforms into tian gui, which develops and maintains reproductive function.  In the next stage physical growth finishes, and eventually declining jing leads to exhaustion of tian gui, thus extinguishing reproductive ability. Inevitably, decline of jing leads to death.

Energy aspects
All of the four kidney energy aspects are essential in growth and development.  These four aspects include kidney jing (essence), kidney yin (water), kidney yang (fire) and kidney qi. All of the body's functions rely on the heat provided by kidney qi and the gate of life (the space between the left and right kidneys). Kidney jing is the foundation of the yin and yang of all the body's organs.  Kidney yin and yang are the primordial yin and yang, and the root of yin and yang to the zang organs.  Kidney yin moistens and nourishes, while kidney yang provides warmth and promotes organs and tissue.  kidney yang is the dynamic force necessary to start the system of balancing water metabolism, which also employs the spleen, lung, liver and san jiao.

Dominating water metabolism
The kidney is considered a water element.  As the body's water gate, it regulates water metabolism and reception of qi.  The foundation of yin fluid that nourishes and moistens the body is kidney yin. When the kidney receives fluid the qi of kidney yang divides it into two types, clear and turbid.  Clear fluid is sent upward through San Jiao to moisten the lung and for the lung to distribute to the body, while turbid fluid is sent downward for expulsion by the bladder.  The water gate is also responsible for regulating the opening and closing of drainage ducts, namely the bladder and anus, which rely on the activity of kidney qi.  Also, while lung qi controls respiration, kidney qi coordinates inhalation.

Additional functions
The kidney is responsible for hair luster, production of bone and brain matter, correct functioning of the ears, and regulating the opening and closing of the bladder and anus.  Mentally, its responsible for supporting memory, while emotionally it is linked to determination, or willpower (zhi).

Notes

Bibliography
 Cheng, X.-n., Deng, L., & Cheng, Y. (Eds.). (1987). Chinese Acupuncture And Moxibustion. Beijing: Foreign Languages Press.
 Dong, Lin (2006). Lecture Notes For COTH2140 Chinese Medicine Theory 1 History Of Chinese Medicine Component. RMIT University: Bundoora West.
 Maciocia, G. (2005). The Foundations Of Chinese Medicine: A Comprehensive Text For Acupuncturists And Herbalists. Philadelphia, Massachusetts: Elseverier Churchill Livingstone.
 Zhiya, Z., Yanchi, L., Ruifu, Z. & Dong, L. (1995). Advanced Textbook On Traditional Chinese Medicine And Pharmacology (Vol. I) . Beijing: New World Press.
 Yin, H.-h., & Shuai, H.-c. (1992). Fundamentals Of Traditional Chinese Medicine. Beijing, China: Foreign Languages Press.

Traditional Chinese medicine